Arbelodes iridescens is a moth in the family Cossidae. It is found in north-eastern South Africa, where it has been recorded from Gauteng and Mpumalanga. The habitat consists of Afromontane forests and thickets.

The length of the forewings is about 12.5 mm. The forewings are glossy pale olive-buff with a white terminal band. The hindwings are glossy citrine drab.

References

Natural History Museum Lepidoptera generic names catalog

Endemic moths of South Africa
Moths described in 1925
Metarbelinae